Tiny Bull Studios is an Italian video game developer based in Turin, Italy. The idea of Tiny Bull Studios was born in 2011 from the videogame passion of its two founders Matteo Lana (the boss) and Rocco Luigi Tartaglia.
Tiny Bull Studios' first game, Space Connect, was released in May 2012.

The company was founded on March 27, 2013 by Matteo Lana, Rocco Luigi Tartaglia, Simone Grosso and Arianna Ciardi.

Personnel
The Chief Executive Officer is Matteo Lana and Rocco Luigi Tartaglia is the Chief Technology Officer.

Games Developed
2019
 Omen Exitio: Plague (Switch)
2018
 Blind (PC, PS4)
 Omen Exitio: Plague (PC)
2013
Alphabots: Training Camp (iOS and web, developed for Edibas Collections Srl) 
Alphabots: AlphaCode (iOS and web, developed for Edibas Collections Srl)
Sheepland (iOS, developed for Cranio Creations)
 2012
 Space Connect (iOS)

Participation to main events
 2019
Exhibitor at Game Developers Conference 2019 
 2017
Exhibitor at Gamescom 2017
 2015
Exhibitor at Gamescom 2015
 2014
Exhibitor at Game connection America 2014 
12th International Quo Vadis Conference
 2013
14th International VIEW Conference
 2012
13th International VIEW Conference

References

External links
 Official website

Video game development companies
Mobile game companies
Video game companies of Italy